Cornelis Ekkart (1 August 1892 – 30 June 1975) was a Dutch fencer. He competed at the 1924 and 1928 Summer Olympics.

References

External links
 

1892 births
1975 deaths
Dutch male sabre fencers
Olympic fencers of the Netherlands
Fencers at the 1924 Summer Olympics
Fencers at the 1928 Summer Olympics
People from Oegstgeest
Sportspeople from Hendrik-Ido-Ambacht
20th-century Dutch people